Circularity may refer to:

Circular definition
Circular economy
Circular reasoning, also known as circular logic
Begging the question
Circularity of an object or roundness
A circularity ratio as a compactness measure of a shape
An assumption of ANOVAs, with repeated-measures, often called "sphericity"

See also
Circular (disambiguation)